Lapugnoy is a commune in the Pas-de-Calais department in the Hauts-de-France region of France.

Geography

Population

Places of interest
 The Commonwealth War Graves Commission cemetery.
 The church of St. Vaast, dating from the nineteenth century.

See also
Communes of the Pas-de-Calais department

References

External links

 Official website of Lapugnoy
 The CWGC cemetery

Communes of Pas-de-Calais